McGauran is a surname. Notable people with the surname include:

 Julian McGauran (born 1957), Australian politician
 Peter McGauran (born 1955), Australian politician